Zadar may refer to:
 Zadar, a city in Croatia
 Zadar County, Croatia
 Zadar Airport, Croatia
 KK Zadar, a basketball team
 Zadar! Cow from Hell, a film

See also
Siege of Zadar (disambiguation)
Bombing of Zadar in World War II